The 2022 FIM Sidecarcross World Championship was the 42nd edition of the competition.

Calendar

The Grand Prix calendar for the 2022 season:

Standings 
The top ten teams in the standings:

Riders Championship

References

External links
 The World Championship on Sidecarcross.com
 FIM Sidecar Motocross World Championship

Sidecarcross World Championship seasons
Sidecar motocross